Jedburgh Castle was a castle at Jedburgh in Scotland. It was fought over during the Wars of Scottish Independence, and was demolished by the Scots commanded by Sir James Douglas of Balvenie in 1409. The site of the original castle was used to build the reform prison based on John Howard (prison reformer) system, the construction of which started in 1820.

Jedburgh Castle Jail
In 1823 a jail was built on the site to designs by Archibald Elliot. It was modified in 1847 by Thomas Brown. This closed in 1868. The building was restored to an 1820s appearance in 1968 by Aitken and Turnbull. It opened to the public as Jedburgh Castle Jail and Museum.  The museum features local history displays.

On the Thursday after Shrove Tuesday, the town has played a Ba Game since 1704. The uppies team use the castle to record their victories.

See also
List of places in the Scottish Borders
List of places in Scotland

References

External links

 Jedburgh Castle Jail and Museum  - official site at Scottish Borders Council 
RCAHMS record of Jedburgh Castle Jail
Gazetteer for Scotland: Jedburgh Castle Jail and Museum
SCRAN image: Jedburgh Castle Gaol

Castles in the Scottish Borders
Category A listed buildings in the Scottish Borders
Former castles in Scotland
Defunct prisons in Scotland
Demolished buildings and structures in Scotland
Museums in the Scottish Borders
Prison museums in the United Kingdom
Local museums in Scotland
Listed castles in Scotland
Listed prison buildings in Scotland
Jedburgh